Carlos Alberto Pimentel (born 17 July 1973) is a Brazilian football coach.

Career
Born in Santo André, São Paulo, Pimentel worked as a fitness coach at Corinthians and Santos before being named Nelsinho Baptista's assistant at Sport Recife in January 2009. He left the club in May when Nelsinho resigned, and subsequently joined Ituano as a fitness coach.

In 2010, Pimentel rejoined Nelsinho's staff at Japanese club Kashiwa Reysol, as a fitness coach. He continued to work with Nelsinho in the following years, having the same role at Vissel Kobe and then again at Kashiwa.

Pimentel returned to Brazil and Ituano on 6 December 2018, again as a fitness coach. Ahead of the 2021 season, he was named assistant coach of the club after the arrival of Mazola Júnior, and also acted as an interim on three occasions as Mazola was suspended.

On 15 July 2022, Pimentel was named interim head coach of Ituano, after Mazola was sacked. On 23 August 2022, after 40 days as an interim, he was permanently appointed head coach of the club.

After narrowly missing out promotion in the 2022 Série B, Pimentel was sacked on 6 February 2023, after starting the new campaign without a win.

References

External links

1973 births
Living people
People from Santo André, São Paulo
Sportspeople from São Paulo (state)
Brazilian football managers
Campeonato Brasileiro Série B managers
Ituano FC managers
Brazilian expatriate sportspeople in Japan